Rrushkull  may refer to:
 Rrushkull, Shkodër, a village in the municipality of Shkodër, Shkodër County, Albania
 Rrushkull, Lezhë, a village in the municipality of Mirditë, Lezhë County, Albania